Protein phosphatase 1 regulatory subunit 14C is an enzyme that in humans is encoded by the PPP1R14C gene.

References

Further reading